This is a list of wars involving the Republic of Panama from the colonial period to the modern era.

List

References

 
Panama
Wars